The Little Falls Township Public Schools is a community public school district that serves students in pre-kindergarten through eighth grade from Little Falls, in Passaic County, New Jersey, United States.

As of the 2018–19 school year, the district, comprising three schools, had an enrollment of 865 students and 94.6 classroom teachers (on an FTE basis), for a student–teacher ratio of 9.1:1.

The district is classified by the New Jersey Department of Education as being in District Factor Group "FG", the fourth-highest of eight groupings. District Factor Groups organize districts statewide to allow comparison by common socioeconomic characteristics of the local districts. From lowest socioeconomic status to highest, the categories are A, B, CD, DE, FG, GH, I and J.

For ninth through twelfth grades, students in public school attend Passaic Valley Regional High School, which also serves students from Totowa and Woodland Park. The school facility is located in Little Falls. As of the 2018–19 school year, the high school had an enrollment of 1,186 students and 102.0 classroom teachers (on an FTE basis), for a student–teacher ratio of 11.6:1.

Awards and recognition
Little Falls School #3 was honored by the National Blue Ribbon Schools Program in 2019, one of nine schools in the state recognized as Exemplary High Performing Schools.

Schools
Schools in the district (with 2018–19 enrollment data from the National Center for Education Statistics) are:
Elementary schools
Little Falls School #2 with 301 students in grades PreK-2
Jill Castaldo, Principal
Little Falls School #3 with 184 students in grades 3-4
Nicole Dilkes, Principal
Middle school
Little Falls School #1 with 376 students in grades 5-8
Dana Sprague, Principal

Administration
Core members of the district's administration are:
Tracey L. Marinelli, Superintendent
Christopher Jones, Business Administrator / Board Secretary

Board of education
The district's board of education, with nine members, sets policy and oversees the fiscal and educational operation of the district through its administration. As a Type II school district, the board's trustees are elected directly by voters to serve three-year terms of office on a staggered basis, with three seats up for election each year held (since 2012) as part of the November general election. The board appoints a superintendent to oversee the day-to-day operation of the district.

References

External links
Little Falls Township Public Schools website

School Data for the Little Falls Township Public Schools, National Center for Education Statistics
Passaic Valley Regional High School

Little Falls, New Jersey
New Jersey District Factor Group FG
School districts in Passaic County, New Jersey